Sachsenhausen is a district on the Havel in the north of the town Oranienburg, 35 kilometres north of Berlin in Germany.  it had a population of 2,735. The district's name means 'Houses of the Saxons'.

The area became notorious for the nearby site of the Nazi  concentration camp - also called  Sachsenhausen - which operated from 1936 to 1945.

For five years after World War II the  Soviets used the facility as  Special Camp No. 7 (later Soviet Special Camp No. 1).

Villages in Brandenburg
Localities in Oberhavel